Johan Saksvik (21 February 1918 – 8 June 1983) was a Norwegian footballer. He played in two matches for the Norway national football team in 1948.

References

External links
 

1918 births
1983 deaths
Norwegian footballers
Norway international footballers
Place of birth missing
Association footballers not categorized by position